Takayama may refer to:

People
Takayama (surname)

Places
Takayama, Gifu, a city
Takayama Castle
Takayama Festival
Takayama Jinya
Takayama Station, a railway station
Takayama, Gunma, a village
Takayama, Nagano, a village
Takayama Main Line, a railway line

Objects
Takayama, a shuttle craft in the movie Star Trek Into Darkness

See also
 高山 (disambiguation)
 Takiyama (disambiguation)
 Tamayama (disambiguation)
 Katayama, a Japanese surname